Sankan Biriwa is a mountain massif in the east of Sierra Leone with two peaks, both over 1,800 metres, the northernmost is the second highest in Sierra Leone at 1,850 m.  The mountain is part of the Tingi Hills Forest Reserve.

Sankan Biriwa covers an area of 143 km2. It has had the status of a national park since 1947.

References

See also 
Protected areas of Sierra Leone

Guinean montane forests
Mountains of Sierra Leone